Ruth Enang Mesode (born 24 February 1958) is a Cameroonian sprinter. She competed in the 100 metres at the 1980 Summer Olympics and the 1984 Summer Olympics.

References

External links
 

1958 births
Living people
Athletes (track and field) at the 1980 Summer Olympics
Athletes (track and field) at the 1984 Summer Olympics
Cameroonian female sprinters
Olympic athletes of Cameroon
Place of birth missing (living people)
Olympic female sprinters
20th-century Cameroonian women